Oyem is the capital of Woleu-Ntem province in northern Gabon, lying on the N2 road and the River Ntem.

Geography
It is the administrative and transport center for the surrounding agricultural area. Oyem is located 411 kilometers away from the national capital, Libreville.

History
Oyem is named after a large tree that grows around the town. In the 1990s, there were several female Peace Corps officers raped and murdered in Gabon, stirring controversy over the safety of its locations.

The town was sieged by rabid dogs in March 2004, who killed three of five residents infected. The town council was forced to shoot 50 strays.

In October 2004, Oyem was affected by water and power cuts. In December of that year, it was severely affected by a rare typhoid fever outbreak which spread across northern Gabon. About 50 cases were reported in Oyem.

A small Jewish community composed of former Christians has developed in Oyem. The community practices Jewish customs, but does not yet have a synagogue.

Economy
Cocoa and coffee are the most important cash crops in Oyem and are trucked to the Cameroon ports of Kribi and Douala for export. Rubber and potatoes are also farmed. The town has an airport, Oyem Airport.

Facilities
Within the town is a hospital, two churches, an agricultural school, a government secondary school, and a customs station.

Demographics

International relations

Twin towns – sister cities
Oyem is twinned with:

 Clermont-Ferrand, France

Notable people
 Daniel Ona Ondo - Gabonese prime minister
 Guélor Kanga - Gabonese football player

See also
 Oyem Solar Power Station

References

Jewish communities
Jews and Judaism in Gabon
Populated places in Woleu-Ntem Province